Listed below are vintage radio programs associated with old-time radio, also called Radio's Golden Age.

United States Golden Age programs

#
10-2-4 Ranch
15 Minutes with Bing Crosby
19 Nocturne Boulevard 
20 Questions
2000 Plus
21st Precinct
33 Half Moon Street
5 Minute Mysteries

A

A Case for Dr. Morelle
The A&P Gypsies
The Abbott and Costello Show
Abbott Mysteries
ABC Mystery Theater 
Abie's Irish Rose
Academy Award Theater
Accordiana
Acousticon Hour
Add a Line
Address Unknown
Adopted Daughter
Adult Education Series
Adventures Ahead
Adventures by Morse
Adventure Parade
The Adventures of the Abbotts
The Adventures of Babe Ruth
The Adventures of Bill Lance
The Adventures of Champion
The Adventures of Charlie Chan
Adventures of Danny Marsdon
The Adventures of Dick Cole
The Adventures of Ellery Queen
The Adventures of Father Brown
The Adventures of Frank Merriwell
The Adventures of Frank Race
The Adventures of Harry Lime
The Adventures of Jack Lime
The Adventures of Maisie
The Adventures of Nero Wolfe
The Adventures of Ozzie and Harriet
The Adventures of Philip Marlowe
The Adventures of Rocky Jordan
The Adventures of Sam Spade
The Adventures of Superman
The Adventures of the Thin Man
The Adventures of Topper 
The Affairs of Ann Scotland 
Against the Storm
The Air Adventures of Jimmie Allen
Air Mail Mystery
A.L. Alexander's Goodwill Court
A.L. Alexander's Mediation Board
The Al Jolson Show
The Alan Young Show
The Aldrich Family
Alec Templeton Time
Alias Jimmy Valentine 
Alka-Seltzer Time
Al Pearce
Amanda of Honeymoon Hill
The Amazing Mr. Malone
The Amazing Nero Wolfe
The American Album of Familiar Music
The American Forum of the Air 
American History Through Radio
American Portraits
The American School of the Air
Americas Answer
Amos 'n' Andy
The Anderson Family
The Andrews Sisters
Andy and Virginia
The Andy Russell Show
Ann of the Airlanes
Arch Oboler's Plays
Archie Andrews
Arco Birthday Party
Are These Our Children
Ask Eddie Cantor
At Ease
The Aunt Jemima Radio Show
Aunt Mary
The Arkansas Traveler
The Armour Jester
Armstrong's Theatre of Today 
The Army Hour
Art Baker's Notebook
Arthur Godfrey's Talent Scouts
Attorney For The Defense
The Atwater Kent Hour
Aunt Jenny's Real Life Stories
Author's Playhouse
Avalon Time
The Avenger
Avengers

B

The Baby Snooks Show
Bachelor's Children
Backstage Wife
The Baker's Broadcast 
Barrie Craig, Confidential Investigator
Beat the Band
The Beatrice Kay Show
Behind the Mike
The Bell Telephone Hour
Betty and Bob 
Beulah
Beyond Midnight
The Bickersons
Big Guy
The Big Show
Big Sister
The Big Story
Big Town
The Bill Goodwin Show 
The Billie Burke Show
The Bing Crosby and Rosemary Clooney Show
Bing Crosby Entertains 
The Bird's Eye Open House 
The Bishop and the Gargoyle
The Black Castle
Blackhawk
Black Hood
The Black Mass
The Black Museum
Blackstone, the Magic Detective
Blackstone Plantation 
Blair of the Mounties
Blind Date
Blondie
Blue Beetle
Blue Monday Jamboree 
Blue Ribbon Town
Bob and Ray
Bob Barclay
The Bob Crosby Show 
The Bob Hope Show
Bobby Benson and the B-Bar-B Riders 
Bold Venture
Border Patrol
Boston Blackie
Box 13
Brave New World
Brave Tomorrow
Break the Bank
Breakfast Club
Breakfast at Sardi's
Breakfast in Hollywood
Brenda Curtis
Brenthouse
Bright Star  (a.k.a. Irene Dunne and Fred MacMurray Show)
The Brighter Day
Bring 'Em Back Alive
Bringing Up Father
Broadway Bandbox 
Broadway Is My Beat
Brownstone Theater
Buck Rogers in the 25th Century
Bulldog Drummond
The Burkiss Way
Burns and Allen

C

Cab Calloway's Quizzical
Cabin B-13 
Cafe Istanbul 
Call for Music 
Call the Police
Calling All Cars
Calling All Detectives
Calloway went thataway
Camel Caravan
Campana Serenade 
The Campbell Playhouse
Candid Microphone
Candy Matson
Can You Top This?
Captain Flagg and Sergeant Quirt 
Captain Midnight
The Carnation Contented Hour
The Carters of Elm Street
The Casebook of Gregory Hood
Case Dismissed
Cases of Mr. Ace
Casey, Crime Photographer
Cavalcade of America
CBS Radio Workshop
Ceiling Unlimited
Challenge of the Yukon
The Chamber Music Society of Lower Basin Street
Chandu the Magician
Charlie Chan
Charlie McCarthy
Charlie Wild, Private Detective 
The Charlotte Greenwood Show
The Chase
The Chase and Sanborn Hour
Chase and Sanborn Program
Chesterfield Supper Club
Chick Carter, Boy Detective
Chickenman 
Chips Davis, Commando
Chuckwagon Jamboree
Cimarron Tavern
The Cinnamon Bear
The Cisco Kid
City Desk
Clara, Lu, and Em
Claudia and David 
Claybourne
The Clicquot Club Eskimos
The Clitheroe Kid
Cloak and Dagger
The Clock
Club Fifteen
Clutching Hand Confession
Coca-Cola Topnotchers 
The Colgate Sports Newsreel
The Collier Hour
Coronet Story Teller
Columbia Presents Corwin
Columbia Workshop
Command Performance
Congo Curt
The Count of Monte Cristo 
Counterspy
The Couple Next Door
The Court of Human Relations.
The Court of Missing Heirs 
The Creaking Door
The Cresta Blanca Hollywood Players 
Crime and Peter Chambers 
Crime Classics
The Crime Club
Crime Doctor
Crime Does Not Pay
The Crime Files of Flamond 
Cruise of the Poll Parrot
The Cuckoo Hour
Curtain Time

D

Damon Runyon Theatre
Dan Dunn, Secret Operative #48
Dan Harding's Wife
Danger Dr. Danfield
Danger With Granger
Dangerous Assignment
Danny Kaye Show
Dark Fantasy
A Date With Judy
The Dave Garroway Show
David Harding: Counterspy
A Day in the Life of Dennis Day
Day of the Triffids
Deadline Dramas 
Dear John
Death Valley Days
December Bride 
Defense Attorney
Dennis Day Show
Destination Freedom
Detectives Black and Blue
Diamond Dramas
The Dick Haymes Show 
Dick Tracy
Dimension X
The Dinah Shore Show 
Doc Barclay's Daughters 
Doc Savage
Doctor Christian
Doctor I.Q.
Doctor Kildare
Doctor Paul
Doctor Sixgun
Dodge Victory Hour
Don McNeil's Breakfast Club
Don Winslow Of The Navy
Douglas of the World
Dragnet
The Dreft Star Playhouse
Drene Time
Duffy's Tavern
Dunninger

E

Easy Aces
The Edgar Bergen/Charlie McCarthy Show
Ed Sullivan Entertains
Ed Sullivan's Pipelines 
The Ed Sullivan Show
Ed Sullivan Variety
The Eddie Bracken Show 
Eddie Condon's Jazz Concerts 
Eileen Barton Show
The Electric Hour
Ellery Queen
Empire Builders
Enna Jettick Melodies
Escape
Ethel and Albert
Europe Confidential
Ever Since Eve 
The Eveready Hour
Everyman's Theater
Everything for the Boys
Exploring Tomorrow

F

The Falcon
Family Skeleton 
Family Theater
Famous Jury Trials 
The Fat Man
Father Knows Best
Favorite Story 
The FBI in Peace and War
Federal Agent
Fibber McGee and Molly
The Fifth Horseman
Finders Keepers
Firefighters
The First Nighter Program
The Fitch Bandwagon
The Five Mysteries Program
Five Star Theater
Flash Gordon
Flywheel, Shyster, and Flywheel
The Ford Sunday Evening Hour
Ford Theater
Foreign Assignment 
Forever Ernest 
Fort Laramie
Four Star Playhouse
Frank Race
Frank Sinatra In Person 
The Frank Sinatra Show 
Frank Sinatra Sings 
The Fred Allen Show
The Fred Waring Show
Frontier Fighters
Frontier Gentleman
Further Adventures of Sherlock Holmes

G

Gang Busters
Gaslight Gayeties
Gasoline Alley
Gateway to Hollywood 
The Gay Nineties Revue 
Gene and Glenn
Gene Autry's Melody Ranch
The General Mills Radio Adventure Theater
The Ghost Corps
GI Jive
G.I. Journal
The Gibson Family 
The Ginny Simms Show 
Glamour Manor 
The Goldbergs
Good News of 1938 
The Good Will Hour
The Goon Show
Granby's Green Acres
Grand Central Station
The Grand Marquee
Grand Ole Opry
The Greatest Story Ever Told
The Great Gildersleeve
The Green Hornet
Great Moments in History
The Green Valley Line
Guest Star
The Guiding Light
The Gulf Headliners
The Gulf Screen Guild Theater
The Gumps
Gunsmoke
Guy Lombardo

H

Hal Perry
The Hall of Fantasy
Hallmark Hall of Fame 
Hallmark Playhouse 
The Halls of Ivy
Hannibal Cobb
Hap Hazard 
The Happiness Boys
The Harold Peary Show
Harold Teen 
Harvest of Stars
Hashknife Hartley
Have Gun, Will Travel
Hawaii Calls
Hawk Durango
Hawk Larabee 
The H-Bar-O Rangers
Hear It Now
Hearts in Harmony
Heathstone
Hello Americans
Helpmate 
The Henry Morgan Show
Her Honor, Nancy James
Hercule Poirot
Here's Frank Sinatra 
Heritage over the Land
The Hermit's Cave
The High-Jinkers
Hilltop House
Honest Harold 
Hollywood Hotel
Hollywood on the Air
Hollywood Showcase 
Hollywood Star Playhouse
Hollywood Star Time (dramatic anthology)
Hollywood Star Time (interview program)
Home of the Brave
Honolulu Bound
Hoofbeats
Hop Harrigan
Hopalong Cassidy
Horatio Hornblower
Hot Copy 
The Hour of Charm 
The Hour of Saint Francis
House of Glass
The House of Mystery 
House of Myths
House Party
The Housewives' Protective League
Howie Wing 
Metal Hall

I

I Deal in Crime 
I Fly Anything 
I Love a Mystery
I Was a Communist for the FBI
In the Name of the Law
In Person, Dinah Shore 
Incredible, but True
Indictment
Information Please
Inheritance
Inner Sanctum Mysteries
The Intimate Revue
The Ipana Troubadors
Irene Dunne and Fred MacMurray Show (a.k.a. Bright Star)
The Irene Rich Show
Island Venture 
It Pays to Be Ignorant
It's a Crime, Mr. Collins
It's a Great Life
It's Higgins, Sir

J

Jack Armstrong, the All-American Boy
The Jack Benny Program
The Jack Berch Show 
The Jack Smith Show 
The Jack Carson Show 
Jean Shepherd
Jeff Regan, Investigator
Jill's Juke Box
The Jimmy Durante Show
The Jimmy Durante and Garry Moore Show
Joan Davis Time 
Joanie's Tea Room
Joe and Mabel
The Joe E. Brown Show
The Joe Penner Show
John J. Anthony
John Steele, Adventurer 
Yours Truly, Johnny Dollar
Johnny Fletcher 
Johnny Mercer's Music Shop
Johnny Midnight 
Johnny Modero, Pier 23
The Johnson Family
John's Other Wife
Jonathan Thomas and his Christmas on the Moon
Jonathan Trimble, Esquire
Joseph Marais and Miranda
Journey into Space
Joyce Jordan, M.D. 
Jubilee
The Judy Canova Show
Jungle Jim
Junior G-Men
Junior Miss
Just Plain Bill
The Jack Kirkwood Show

K

Kate Hopkins, Angel of Mercy
The Kate Smith Hour
Kay Kyser's Kollege of Musical Knowledge
Keeping Up With Daughter
The Ken Murray Program
The Key
Kitchen-Klatter
Knickerbocker Playhouse
Komedic Kapers
Korn's-A-Krackin'
Kraft Music Hall

L

Ladies Be Seated 
Land of the Lost
Laundryland Lyrics 
Leave It to Joan 
Lear Radio Show
Leo is on the Air
The Les Paul Show
Lest We Forget
Let George Do It
Let's Go to Town
Let's Pretend
Let's Pretend with Uncle Russ
Life Can Be Beautiful
The Life of Riley
Life with Luigi
Life with the Lyons
Light of the World
Light Up Time
Lightning Jim
Lights Out
The Lineup
Little Orphan Annie
The Lives of Harry Lime
The Lone Ranger
Lonely Women
The Longines Symphonette
Long John Nebel
Lorenzo Jones
Louella Parsons
Luke Slaughter of Tombstone
Lum and Abner
Luncheon at Sardi's
Lux Radio Theatre

M

Ma and Pa
Ma Perkins
Magic Island
The Magic Key of RCA
Mail Call
Major Bowes Amateur Hour
Major Hoople
Mama Bloom's Brood
A Man Called Jordan
The Man Called X
Mandrake the Magician
Manhattan Merry-Go-Round
Marie the Little French Princess
Mark Trail
The Marriage
The Martin and Lewis Show
Martin Kane, Private Eye
Mary Foster, Editor's Daughter
Matinee Theater
Maxwell House Showboat
Mayor of the Town
Meet Mr. McNulty
Metal Hall
Meet Corliss Archer
Meet Frank Sinatra 
Meet Me at Parky's
Meet Millie
Meet the Meeks
The Mel Blanc's Fix-It Shop 
The Mercury Summer Theatre of the Air
The Mercury Theatre on the Air
MGM Musical Comedy Theater of the Air
The MGM Theater of the Air
Michael Shayne
The Mickey Mouse Theater of the Air
The Mildred Bailey Revue
Millions for Defense
The Milton Berle Show
The Minute Men
The Mirth Parade
The Misadventures of Si and Elmer
Les Misérables
Mollé Mystery Theatre
Mommie and the Men
Monitor
Monticello Party Line
Moon Over Africa
The Morey Amsterdam Show
Mr and Mrs. Blandings
Mr. and Mrs. North
Mr. District Attorney
Mr. Keen, Tracer of Lost Persons
Mr. Moto
Mrs. Wiggs of the Cabbage Patch
Murder and Mr. Malone
Murder at Midnight
Murder By Experts
Murder Is My Hobby 
Music Appreciation Hour 
My Favorite Husband
My Friend Irma
My Name is Adam Kane
Myrt & Marge
The Mysterious Traveler
Mystery is my Hobby
Mystery House
Mystery in the Air
My True Story
Mystery Is My Hobby

N

National Barn Dance
The National Farm and Home Hour
NBC Presents: Short Story
NBC Symphony Orchestra
NBC University Theater
Ned Jordan:Secret Agent
The Nelson Eddy Show
Nestle Chocolateers 
The New Adventures of Nero Wolfe
The New Adventures of Sherlock Holmes
Nick Carter, Master Detective
Night Beat
Night Editor
Nightfall
Now and Forever
Now Hear This
Now Nordine

O

The Ol' Dirt Dauber
Oldsmobile Program 
On The 8:15
On Broadway
One Man's Family
The Original Amateur Hour
The Orson Welles Almanac
The Orson Welles Show
Our Gal Sunday
Our Miss Brooks
Ozark Jubilee
Ozzie and Harriet

P

Pabst Blue Ribbon Town
Painted Dreams
Palmolive Beauty Box Theater
Parties at Pickfair
The Passing Parade
Pat Novak, for Hire
The Penny Singleton Show
People Are Funny
Pepsodent Show Starring Bob Hope
Pepper Young's Family
Perry Mason
Pete Kelly's Blues
Philco Radio Time
The Phil Harris-Alice Faye Show
Philip Morris Playhouse
Phillip Marlowe: Private Detective
Philo Vance
Phyl Coe Mysteries
Pick and Pat
The Planet Man
Point Sublime
Police Headquarters
Police Reporter
Portia Faces Life
Ports of Call
Pot o' Gold
Professor Quiz
Proudly We Hail
Pursuit

Q

Queen for a Day
Quick As a Flash
Quiet, Please
Quiz Kids

R

Radio Espionage
Radio Reader's Digest
The Railroad Hour
Ranger Bill
Ray Bolger Show
Red Foley Show
Red Ryder
The Red Skelton Show
Reflections 
Reg'lar Fellers
Richard Diamond, Private Detective
The Right to Happiness
Road of Life
Rocky Fortune
Rocky Jordan
Rogue's Gallery
The Romance of Helen Trent
Romance of the Ranchos
Rosa Rio Rhythms
Roxy and His Gang
The Roy Rogers Show
The Rudy Vallée Show

S

The Sad Sack
The Saint
Sam 'n' Henry
Sam Spade
Saturday Night Serenade 
Scattergood Baines 
Screen Director's Playhouse
The Screen Guild Theater
Secret Agent K7 Returns
Secret Missions
Secrets of Scotland Yard
Sergeant Preston of the Yukon
The Sealtest Village Store
The Second Mrs. Burton 
The Shadow
The Shadow of Fu Manchu
Shell Chateau
Sherlock Holmes
The Silver Eagle
Silver Theater
Sinclair Weiner Minstrels
Sing Along With the Landt Trio
Singin' Sam
The Six Shooter
Sky King
Sleep No More
Smiley Burnette
Smilin' Jack
The Smiths of Hollywood
Soconyland Sketches
Songs by Dinah Shore
So Proudly We Hail
Songs by Sinatra 
Sophie Tucker and Her Show
Space Patrol
Sparkle Time 
Speed Gibson of the International Secret Police
The Spike Jones Show
Spotlight Revue
Squad Cars
The Stan Freberg Show
Stand By for Crime
The Standard Hour
The Standard School Broadcast 
Stars over Hollywood
Stella Dallas
Stop Me If You've Heard This One
Stop the Music
Stories of the Black Chamber
The Story of Bess Johnson
The Story of Mary Marlin 
The Strange Dr. Weird
Studio One
Suspense

T

Take It or Leave It
Tales from the Diamond K
Tales of Fatima
Tales of the Texas Rangers
Tarzan
Taystee Bread Winners
Teen Timers
Tennessee Ernie Ford Show
Tennessee Jed
The Tenth Man
Terry and the Pirates
Texas Rangers
Texaco Star Theater
Thanks to the Yanks
That Brewster Boy
That's Rich
Theater Five
Theater of Romance
Theatre Guild on the Air
The Couple Next Door
The Third man
This Amazing America 
This Is My Best
This Is My Story
This is Nora Drake
This Is Your FBI
This Is Your Life
Those Websters
Time for Love 
Today's Children
Tom Corbett, Space Cadet
Tom Mix
The Twelve Players
To Be Perfectly Frank 
Tommy Riggs and Betty Lou
Top Secret
Topper
Town Hall
Town Hall Tonight
Treasury Star Parade
True Adventures of Junior G-Men
The True Story Court of Human Relations
True Detective
Truth or Consequences
Twenty Questions
The Twenty-Second Letter

U

Uncle Charlie's Tent Show
Uncle Don
Uncle Jim's Question Bee
Uncle Whoa Bill
The Unexpected
Unit 99
Unshackled
Up For Parole

V

Valiant Lady
Vic and Sade
The Vikings
Viva America
The Voice of Firestone
Vox Pop
Voyage of the Scarlet Queen

W

Waltz Time
War Telescope
We the People
Weird Circle
Whatever Became OfWhen a Girl MarriesThe WhispererWhispering StreetsThe WhistlerWhitehall 1212Who Said That?The Adventures of Wild Bill HickokWilly Piper ShowThe Witch's TaleWoodSongs Old-Time Radio HourWoman in WhiteWonder ShowWorlds at WarWorld Adventurer's ClubWorld We're Fighting ForXThe Xavier Cugat ShowX Minus OneYYou Are ThereYou Bet Your LifeYou Can't Do Business with HitlerYoung Doctor MaloneYoung Widder BrownYour Hit ParadeYour Story HourYours Truly, Johnny DollarZThe Ziegfeld Follies of the AirPost-OTR U.S. radio programs2000XAdventures of Harry NileAlien WorldsThe Cabinet of Dr. FritzCBS Radio Mystery TheaterEarplayThe Firesign TheatreThe Fourth Tower of InvernessFurther Adventures of Sherlock HolmesThe General Mills Radio Adventure TheaterHollywood Theater of the EarImagination TheaterNPR PlayhouseNPR's serialized adaptations of Star Wars, The Empire Strikes Back, and Return of the JediA Prairie Home CompanionRadio SpiritsSears Radio TheaterSeeing Ear TheaterWhen Radio WasThe Zero HourCanadian Golden Age programsAfter Breakfast BreakdownAssignmentAunt LucyBlended RhythmBorden's Canadian CavalcadeBrave VoyageBritish Ballad OperasCanadian Theatre of the AirCBC Wednesday NightCitizen's ForumComrades in ArmsCourt Of OpinionsThe Craig'sCuckoo Clock HouseDays Of SailDon Messer and His IslandersEscape with MeFighting NavyFrom Leicester Square to BroadwayFront Line FamilyThe GillansGilmour's AlbumsThe Happy GangHarmony HarbourIn Search of OurselvesJake and the KidJohn and JudyThe Johnny Home ShowJust MaryLaura LimitedLet's Go to the Music HallL for LankyKindergarten of the AirMaggie MugginsMagic AdventuresMen in ScarletThe Merchant Navy ShowThe National Farm Radio ForumNow I Ask YouOpportunity KnocksRawhideThe Rod and Charles ShowThe Romance of CanadaSinging Stars of TomorrowThe Small Types ClubStageStag PartyStories Read by John DrainieTheatre of FreedomThis Is the ArmyThe Tommy Hunter ShowTrans-Canada MatineeTreasure TrailWayne and ShusterGolden Age-emulating Canadian radio programsNero Wolfe (a.k.a. Rex Stout's Nero Wolfe)NightfallThe Vinyl CafeAustralian Golden Age programsArgonauts Club Dad and Dave from Snake Gully''

See also
 List of films based on radio series
 List of U.S. radio programs
 List of old-time radio people

References

External links
 Housewives' Protective League collection at the University of Maryland Libraries
 Australian Old Time Radio Recordings

American radio programs
Radio-related lists
Lists of radio programs